Several vessels have been named Argo for the ship Argo of Greek mythology. Such ships are listed below in ascending chronology.

  was an American schooner that was wrecked in Fiji during January 1800. 
  was launched in 1802 in France, possibly under another name, and captured c.1804. She became a whaler in the British Southern Whale Fishery and made two complete whale hunting voyages. A US Navy frigate captured her on her third voyage.
  was built in 1806 at Chittagong, present-day Bangladesh. She was registered in Calcutta to Payne & Tyrce. She disappeared in 1814 off the coast of Tasmania after having been "run away with" by convicts.
 was built in France in 1783 and was taken in prize circa 1806. She sailed as a slave ship and was lost on the coast of Africa before she had acquired any slaves. 
  was launched at Whitby as a West Indiaman. She made one voyage to India under a license from the British East India Company (EIC). Thereafter she traded between Liverpool and Miramichi, New Brunswick. She was last listed in 1824 and may have foundered in June 1824.
  was an iron screw steamer. She was the first screw steamship to circumnavigate the earth.
  is a two-masted Marconi rigged schooner. She was built in 2006 in Samut Prakan, Thailand at Marsun Shipyards. She is owned and operated by Seamester Study Abroad Programs as one of two sail training vessels the company operates.

Ship names